Baron Morrison, of Tottenham in the County of Middlesex, was a title in the Peerage of the United Kingdom. It was created on 16 November 1945 for the Labour politician Robert Morrison. The title became extinct the death of his son, the second Baron, on 29 October 1997.

Baron Morrison (1945)
Robert Craigmyle Morrison, 1st Baron Morrison (1881–1953)
Dennis Glossop Morrison, 2nd Baron Morrison (1914–1997)

References

Extinct baronies in the Peerage of the United Kingdom
Noble titles created in 1945
Noble titles created for UK MPs